The 1987 Prize of Moscow News was the 22nd edition of an international figure skating competition organized in Moscow, Soviet Union. It was held November 11–15, 1987. Medals were awarded in the disciplines of men's singles, ladies' singles, pair skating and ice dancing. The men's title went to World champion Alexandre Fadeev,  winning the Prize of Moscow News for the fourth time. Cindy Bortz, moving up to the senior level after winning the world junior title, won the ladies' category. Ekaterina Gordeeva / Sergei Grinkov, who would win the Olympic gold medal later in the season, took the pairs' title ahead of 1984 Olympic champions Elena Valova / Oleg Vasiliev. The ice dancing title was won by Marina Klimova / Sergei Ponomarenko, who would end their season with an Olympic silver medal.

Men

Ladies

Pairs

Ice dancing

References

1987 in figure skating
Prize of Moscow News